As was the custom since 1930, the 1954 Tour de France was contested by national and regional teams. Seven national teams were sent, with 10 cyclists each from France, the Netherlands, Belgium, Spain, Switzerland and Luxembourg/Austria (the latter a combined team). France additionally sent five regional teams from 10 cyclists each, divided into Center-North East France, West France, South East France, Ile de France and South West France.
The combined team Luxembourg/Austria consisted of six Luxembourgian cyclists, three Austrian cyclists and one from Liechtenstein. In total, 110 cyclists started the race.

Notable absents were the Italian cyclists. In Italy, new sponsors had entered the market, named "extra-sportives" because they did not sell a product directly related to the sport. During the 1954 Giro d'Italia, this caused a strike, the Bernina strike. After this, the Italian federation decided not to send a team to the 1954 Tour de France.

Start list

By team

By rider

By nationality

References

1954 Tour de France
1954